The Ambassador from New Zealand to Germany is New Zealand's foremost diplomatic representative in the Federal Republic of Germany, and in charge of New Zealand's diplomatic mission in Germany.

The embassy is located in Berlin, Germany's capital city.  New Zealand has maintained a resident ambassador in Germany since 1966.  The Ambassador to Germany is concurrently accredited to Switzerland, Liechtenstein the Czech Republic, Lithuania, Latvia, and Estonia.

List of heads of mission

Ambassadors to Germany
 Reuel Lochore (1966–1969)
 Doug Zohrab (1969–1975)
 Hunter Wade (1975–1978)
 Basil Bolt (1978–1982)
 Jack Shepherd (1982–1985)
 Ted Farnon (1985–1990)
 Richard Grant (1990–1994)
 Gerry Thompson (1994–1998)
 Win Cochrane (1998–2003)
 Peter Hamilton (2003–2014)
 Rodney Harris (2014–2018)
 Rupert Holborow (2018–2022)
 Craig Hawke (2022–)

References
 New Zealand Heads of Overseas Missions: Germany.  New Zealand Ministry of Foreign Affairs and Trade.  Retrieved on 2008-03-29.

Germany, Ambassadors from New Zealand to
 
New Zeal